Aberdeen Hospital may refer to:

 Aberdeen Regional Hospital situated in New Glasgow, Nova Scotia, Canada
 Aberdeen Provincial Hospital (Eastern Cape) situated in Aberdeen, Eastern Cape, South Africa

See also 
 Aberdeen (disambiguation)